Lee Se-jin (born 9 November 1981) is a South Korean singer known professionally as Lyn. She has released ten studio albums to date.

Career 
Lyn was first scouted by an agency because of her voice and from there, she first made her debut under her real name, Lee Se-jin, and released an album. The album sold poorly and was barely known. Lyn then took some time off to train vocally.  She made a comeback in 2002 under the name Lyn with her supposedly first album Have You Ever Have A Broken Heart?. It was very successful and was able to shoot her up to one of the top R&B female solo singer of the year.  After a surprise two years hiatus, Lyn released her second album Can U See The Bright.  The album was very successful, surpassing her previous album with her popular single, "사랑했잖아" (Used To Love).  Due to its popularity, the song was eventually covered on another successful singer Lee Seung-gi's album, released in late 2006.  Lyn released her third album, The Pride of the Morning, on 7 March 2007, and sold 15,358 copies in that month, placing second in the Music Industry Association of Korea's monthly chart. Again, it was a success and was once again reclaim her title as one of the best R&B female singer.  Overall her album sold 25,171 copies. Lyn then released more albums afterwards, and did not become very successful, but in 2009 she made a comeback with her 5th album called 'Let Go, Let In, It's a New Day'. In early 2012, she released her 7th album title 'Love Fiction'.

In 2012, she sang "Back in Time" for the soundtrack of period drama Moon Embracing the Sun. She then sang "My Destiny" for My Love from the Star, for which she won "Best Original Soundtrack" at the 50th Baeksang Arts Awards in 2014. She is the first artist to win in the category. 
In 2015, she also sang "Just One Day" for melodrama Mask, followed by "Such Person" with 4MEN's Shin Young Jae for the drama Oh My Venus. In 2016 she sang "With You" for the drama Descendants of the Sun. After that, she sang "Love Story" for the main soundtrack of The Legend of the Blue Sea. In 2018, she collaborated with Hanhae on "LOVE", a song from the soundtrack of Are You Human Too?.

Lyn collaborated with singer The One at a China programme, "I Am A Singer 3". The episode was broadcast on 27 March 2015.

On 27 October 2015, Lyn's label MUSIC&NEW announced on through an official Facebook post that the singer's contract with the company had ended. She would be continuing promotions under her new individual music label COMPANY919.

Personal life
Lyn married her longtime boyfriend Lee Soo of MC the Max at Conrad Hotel Seoul on 19 September 2014.

Discography

Studio albums

Live albums

Compilation albums

Extended plays

Singles

As lead artist

Collaborations

Soundtrack appearances

Music videos

Awards and nominations

Notes

References

External links 
 Lyn's at Cyworld
 Lyn on Empas People

1981 births
Living people
People from Namyangju
South Korean women pop singers
South Korean female idols
South Korean rhythm and blues singers
MAMA Award winners
Konkuk University alumni
Melon Music Award winners
21st-century South Korean singers
21st-century South Korean women singers